Bruce Furness is an American politician, the former mayor of Fargo, North Dakota. He served as mayor from 1994 until 2006.

Furness is a former manager at IBM and a bank executive.

References

Mayors of Fargo, North Dakota
Living people
Year of birth missing (living people)